Krašce (in older sources also Krašice) is a small settlement in the Municipality of Moravče in central Slovenia. It lies on the main road west of Moravče. The area is part of the traditional region of Upper Carniola. It is now included with the rest of the municipality in the Central Slovenia Statistical Region.

Name
Krašce was attested in historical sources as Grastich in 1304, Craecz in 1345, Chrasticz in 1431, and Krast in 1426, among other spellings.

References

External links

Krašce on Geopedia

Populated places in the Municipality of Moravče